The FIA Formula 3 European Championship was a European Formula Three(F3) auto racing competition, organised by the Fédération Internationale de l'Automobile (FIA). After one season of the FIA Formula 3 International Trophy, the FIA revived the FIA Formula 3 European Championship. The ten-event season included seven Formula 3 Euro Series rounds, two British Formula Three rounds and DTM-supporting round at Brands Hatch. From 2013, the series started running its own rounds, based upon the defunct Formula 3 Euro Series.

In 2019, the series merged with the GP3 Series to form the FIA Formula 3 Championship, and was due to relaunch as the Formula European Masters and run in support of the Deutsche Tourenwagen Masters. The championship was cancelled ahead of its debut season due to lack of competitors. The championship would have used the current spec cars and were working with Dallara to design a new car for 2020.

Car history and current specifications

Chassis
The FIA Formula 3 European Championship is a third-tier single-seater formula car. A spec-series, the championship mandates chassis and engine manufacturers which teams must use each season. The championship controls and specifies the chassis and engine manufacturers that teams are allowed to use each season. The league's choice of manufacturers are changed every three years.  Currently, Dallara provides a specification chassis to all teams since inaugural season. Teams are prohibited from performing engine or chassis modifications.
The current Dallara F317 features an airboxless roll hoop and also left-side separated airbox on upside sidepod. The chassis construction of Dallara F317 car are carbon-fibre monocoque incorporated with honeycomb structure. The Dallara F317 also includes bi-plane front wing, bi-plane rear wing and also lower nose (similar to current Formula One cars)

Transmission, gearbox and clutches
For the transmission gearboxes, all FIA Formula 3 European cars currently use a semi-automatic transmission with 6-speed gearbox operated by paddle shifters since the 2012 season. The clutch of all FIA Formula 3 European cars are CFRP 3-plate clutch operated by foot-pedal. Mechanical limited-slip differential are also allowed and constant velocity joint tripod driveshafts are also used. The transmission fluid supplier is currently the RAVENOL F3 Gear premium oil.

Brakes
AP Racing supplies monobloc brake calipers, cast-iron brake discs, pads and disc bells, which are exclusive to all FIA Formula 3 European cars.

Wheel rims
ATS exclusively supplies wheel rims for all FIA Formula 3 European cars since the inaugural 2012 season. The wheel rims of all FIA Formula 3 European cars are made of magnesium alloy wheels.

Tyres
Hankook was the sole tyre partner for the series since the 2012 season until 2018. The FIA Formula 3 European tyres runs the bespoke compounds and smaller size since 2012. The front tyre sizes are 180/550-R13 and the rear tyre sizes are 240/570-R13.

Cockpit and other safety components
For the safety equipment, all FIA Formula 3 European cars seating uses removable carbon-fibre shell driver's seat with 6-point seat belts. The steering wheel of all FIA Formula 3 European cars are universally supplied by XAP Technologies. All FIA Formula 3 European cars are also equipped with XAP data display units since the 2012 season.

Rear view mirrors for all FIA Formula 3 European cars are fully mandated to easily view opponents behind.

Fuel tank
The fuel tank of all FIA Formula 3 European cars are made of kevlar-reinforced rubber safety tank supplied by ATL with FT3 standard. Currently the fuel tank capacity of all FIA Formula 3 European cars are  since 2012.

Other components
All FIA Formula 3 European cars carry a Bosch-provided electronic control unit (Motronic MS 5.8 model), but traction control and anti-lock brakes are prohibited. Live telemetry is used only for television broadcasts, but the data can be recorded from the ECU to the computer if the car is in the garage and not on the track.

Engines
The cars are powered by naturally-aspirated (no turbocharger or supercharger) direct fuel injection (since 2014) inline-4 engines, with aluminium alloy blocks, and a DOHC valvetrain actuating four-valves per cylinder, and limited to  displacement since the series' inauguration in 2012. DTM car's engines are currently producing over  power output between 5,000-7,400 rpm. Currently Mercedes-AMG (operated by Mercedes-AMG HPP) and Volkswagen providing the engines currently maximum three teams per one manufacturer. ThreeBond Nissan and Neil Brown Engineering has provided engines in 2012-2016 and 2014-2016 but both companies left at the end of the 2016 season respectively due to competitor reduction to 19 cars.

FIA Formula 3 European engines are rev-limited to 7,400 rpm. The valve train is a dual overhead camshaft configuration with four valves per cylinder. The crankshaft is made of alloy steel, with five main bearing caps. The pistons are forged aluminum alloy, while the connecting rods are machined alloy steel. The firing ignition is a CDI ignition system. The engine lubrication is a dry sump type, cooled by a single water pump.

Engines must be built from a production model block (stock block), and often must be sealed by race or series organizers, so no private tuning can be carried out.

Spark plugs
All FIA Formula 3 European cars carried a spark plugs are made of iridium and supplied exclusively by Bosch since 2012.

Exhaust systems
The exhaust systems of all FIA Formula 3 European cars are silencer type but made by titanium with operation of three-way catalytic converter. Currently Remus are providing the exhaust systems.

Fuel

FIA Formula 3 European cars currently use ordinary fossil unleaded racing fuel, which has been the de facto standard in European third-tier single-seater formula racing since Formula 3 Euroseries in 2003 and the formation of FIA Formula 3 European in 2012. Since the 2005 Formula 3 Euroseries season, per agreement with ITR e.V., which has promoted the series from that to FIA European Formula 3 and later Formula European Masters, BP is the official fuel supplier using their German Aral Ultimate brand

Current Aral Ultimate 102 RON unleaded gasoline resembles the ordinary unleaded public vehicles gasoline which has better mileage, environmental-friendly and safer than other fuels.

Lubricants
The current lubricant supplier of all FIA Formula 3 European cars is Ravenol.

Performance
According to research and pre-season stability tests, the current model can go 0 to 60 mph in approximately 3 seconds. The car has a top speed of over  depending on the circuit and gearing meaning that it is the fourth fastest single-seater formula car behind Formula 1, Formula 2 and GP3 Series.

Specifications
Engine displacement:  DOHC inline-4
Gearbox: 6-speed paddle shift gearbox + 1 reverse
Weight: 
Power output: 
Fuel: Aral Ultimate 102 RON unleaded
Fuel capacity: 
Fuel delivery: Direct fuel injection
Aspiration: Naturally aspirated
Length: 
Width: 
Wheelbase: 
Steering:  Power-assisted rack and pinion

Race format
Following two practice sessions, the first of two qualifying sessions will be held on Friday afternoon. Race 1 starts on Saturday morning, while Qualifying 2 is usually scheduled for the afternoon. On Sunday, the two remaining races will be held, with Race 2 taking off on Sunday morning and Race 3 concluding the weekend in the afternoon. Each race will consist of 33 minutes plus one lap and covers a distance of about 100 kilometres.

Champions

Drivers'

Teams'

Rookies'
The result of the championship was decided by different standings. Wins and points of the rookie standings are present in brackets.

Drivers who graduated to Formula One

 Bold denotes an active Formula One driver.

† Competed as a guest driver ineligible to score championship points.

See also

 Formula Three
 Formula 3 Euro Series
 FIA European Formula Three Cup
 FIA Formula 3 International Trophy

References

External links

 
FIA European Formula 3 Championship at Forix.com

 
Fédération Internationale de l'Automobile
Recurring sporting events established in 2012
Recurring sporting events disestablished in 2018
2012 establishments in Europe
2018 disestablishments in Europe
Formula Three series